Deer Creek is a stream in Berrien County, in the U.S. state of Michigan. It is a tributary to the South Branch Galien River.

Deer Creek was named for the abundance of deer along its course.

References

Rivers of Berrien County, Michigan
Rivers of Michigan